Papilio syfanius is a species of swallowtail butterfly from the genus Papilio that is found in China. where it is endemic.

Subspecies
Papilio syfanius syfanius (northern Yunnan)
Papilio syfanius albosyfanius Shimogori & Fujioka, 1997 (northern Yunnan)
Papilio syfanius kongaensis (Yoshino, 1997) (Sichuan)

References

Other reading
Erich Bauer and Thomas Frankenbach, 1998 Schmetterlinge der Erde, Butterflies of the world Part I (1), Papilionidae Papilionidae I: Papilio, Subgenus Achillides, Bhutanitis, Teinopalpus. Edited by  Erich Bauer and Thomas Frankenbach.  Keltern : Goecke & Evers ; Canterbury : Hillside Books 

syfanius
Butterflies described in 1886
Butterflies of Asia
Taxa named by Charles Oberthür